Palkin (from пaлкa meaning a stick) is a Russian masculine surname, its feminine counterpart is Palkina. It may refer to

Ksenia Ulukan (née: Palkina in 1989), Kyrgyzstani tennis player
Serhiy Palkin (born 1974), Ukrainian football functionary
Sofiya Palkina (born 1998), Russian hammer thrower

Russian-language surnames